Sir Thomas Palmer, 1st Baronet (1540–1626), 'the Travailer,’ was an English knight and politician.

Life

Palmer was the third son of Sir Henry Palmer of Wingham, Kent, by his wife Jane, daughter of Sir Richard Windebank of Guisnes, and was nephew of Sir Thomas Palmer (died 1553). He was High Sheriff of Kent in 1595, and in the following year went on the expedition to Cadiz, when he was knighted.

He was a Member of the Parliament of England in 1586 and 1601 for Arundel. and created a baronet on 29 June 1621.

He died on 2 January 1625–6, aged 85, and was buried at Wingham. He had married Margaret, daughter of John Pooley of Badley, Suffolk, who died in August 1625, aged 85. Of his three sons, all knighted, Sir Thomas died before his father, and was himself father of Herbert Palmer. The second son, Sir Roger, was master of the household to Charles I, and the third son, Sir James, was a courtier, MP and Chancellor of the Order of the Garter.

Works
In 1606 Palmer published An Essay of the Meanes how to make our Travailes into forraine Countries the more profitable and honourable, London,. Here he discussed the advantages of foreign travel, and political and commercial principles which the traveller should understand. The book is dated from Wingham, where the author is said to have kept 60 hospitable Christmases without intermission.

Others of the name

The 'Travailer' must be distinguished from Thomas Palmer or Palmar, a Roman Catholic scholar, who graduated B.A. from Brasenose College, Oxford, in 1553, but who subsequently became a primary scholar of St. John's College, and was in 1563 appointed principal of Gloucester Hall. He was a zealous catholic, and, after a steady refusal to conform, he had in 1564 to retire from his headship to his estates in Essex, where persecution is said to have followed him. Wood describes him as an excellent orator, and 'the best of his time for a Ciceronian style'.

References

1540 births
1626 deaths
High Sheriffs of Kent
People from Wingham, Kent
English knights
Baronets in the Baronetage of England
English MPs 1586–1587
English MPs 1601
English essayists
17th-century English writers
17th-century English male writers